Branislav Obžera (born 29 August 1981) is a Slovak former football midfielder.

Club career
Obžera previously played for Baník Prievidza and FC Artmedia Bratislava in the Slovak Superliga and for FC Saturn Moscow Oblast in the Russian Premier League.

International career
Obžera earned his first call-up for the Slovakia national football team in September 2007.

Honours
Slovak Superliga (3):
2005, 2008, 2009

References

External links
 

1981 births
Living people
People from Prievidza District
Sportspeople from the Trenčín Region
Slovak footballers
Association football midfielders
Slovakia international footballers
Slovak Super Liga players
FC Baník Prievidza players
FK Dukla Banská Bystrica players
ŠK Slovan Bratislava players
FC Petržalka players
FC DAC 1904 Dunajská Streda players
Slovak expatriate footballers
Expatriate footballers in Russia
FC Saturn Ramenskoye players
Russian Premier League players
Slovak expatriate sportspeople in Russia